Katarina Srebotnik and Nenad Zimonjić were the defending champions but lost to Casey Dellacqua and Scott Lipsky in the final    This was the only major championship won by either Dellacqua or Lipsky in their careers.

Seeds

Draw

Finals

Top half

Bottom half

External links
 Main draw
2011 French Open – Doubles draws and results at the International Tennis Federation

Mixed Doubles
French Open by year – Mixed doubles